North West Wolves are a rugby league club in Niddrie, Victoria. The club takes part in the Victorian Rugby League and conducts junior, senior men, senior women's and Masters (over 35yrs) teams.

Current president is Anthony Murrells.

Notable  Juniors
 Greg Marzhew (2021- Gold Coast Titans)

See also

Rugby league in Victoria

References

External links
North West Wolves Fox Sports pulse

Rugby league clubs in Melbourne
Rugby league teams in Victoria (Australia)
Rugby clubs established in 2010
2010 establishments in Australia
Sport in the City of Moonee Valley